"Gravity" is a song by DJ Fresh, an English drum and bass producer and DJ, released as the fifth single from Fresh's forthcoming fourth studio album. It was released on 8 February 2015 in the United Kingdom. The song features English recording artist Ella Eyre. The song also features on Eyre's debut studio album Feline (2015).

Music video
The music video is shot in Tucson, Arizona by Madoff Productions. It features DJ Fresh and Eyre driving in the car while police chase them.

Track listing

Charts

Weekly charts

Year-end charts

Certifications

Release history

References

2015 singles
2015 songs
DJ Fresh songs
Ella Eyre songs
Polydor Records singles
Ministry of Sound singles
Song recordings produced by DJ Fresh
Songs written by DJ Fresh
Songs written by Ella Eyre